Petty France may refer to

 Petty France, Gloucestershire, a hamlet in the English county of Gloucestershire
 Petty France, London, a street in London

See also:
 Petite France (disambiguation)
 Little France (disambiguation)